The 2022 IFAF Women's World Championship was the fourth IFAF Women's World Championship, an American football competition for women. It was held between July 30 and August 7, 2022, after originally having been planned for 2021. The tournament was hosted at Myyrmäen jalkapallostadion in Vantaa, Finland. The defending champion is the United States.

On the eve of the tournament, Mexico announced that they would not be able to make it to Finland for their first round game against Great Britain, putting their participation in the tournament in jeopardy. The next day it was announced that Great Britain would win their quarterfinal matchup with Mexico on walk over.

Participating teams

Bracket

Games

Gameday One

Gameday Two

Gameday Three

References

IFAF Women's World Championship
IFAF
IFAF
International sports competitions hosted by Finland
IFAF
IFAF